Scutus breviculus is a common herbivorous species of large sea snail or limpet with the common name shield shell or less commonly duck's bill limpet. It is a marine gastropod mollusc in the family Fissurellidae, the keyhole limpets and slit limpets.

Description 
Like most in this genus the animal has a large muscular mantle, folds of which can completely cover the whitish shell, giving it a slug-like appearance. In S. breviculus the colour is a glossy dark almost jet black, as are the thick tentacles and snout. These inhabitants of the sub-littoral fringe shun light, clinging to the undersides of large rocks and boulders in a wide range of habitats, usually down to a depth of 20 metres. At night they move around to feed, usually browsing on various alga such as Hormosira, or Ulva sp. in estuaries and harbours, often returning to the same bare scar in the rock in which they spent the previous day. This is sometimes referred to as 'homing behaviour'.
An ancient food source for the Maori, who named it rori, a common name for a largish slug-like marine animal.

S. breviculus can grow up to 240mm in length and weigh over a kilogram.

Distribution 
This species occurs in and around New Zealand, also across Southern Australia. It is notably absent from the Chatham Islands.

References

Further reading 
 Owen G. (1958). "Observations on the stomach and digestive gland of Scutus breviculus (Blainville)". Journal of Molluscan Studies 33(3): 103-114. abstract
 Tucker L. E. (15 December 1970). "Effects of external salinity on Scutus breviculus (Gastropoda, Prosobranchia) — II. Nerve conduction". Comparative Biochemistry and Physiology 37(4): 467-472. 

Fissurellidae
Gastropods described in 1817